Phyllonorycter juglandis is a moth of the family Gracillariidae. It is known from Hokkaidō island in Japan.

The wingspan of this moth is 6.5–8 mm. The larvae feed on Juglans ailanthifolia and Pterocarya rhoifolia. They mine the leaves of their host plant. The mine has the form of a ptychonomous leaf mine, situated between two veins or rarely along the margin of the lower surface of the leaves.

References

juglandis
Moths of Japan
Moths described in 1963